The 29th edition of the Men's Asian Amateur Boxing Championships was held from April 30 to May 7, 2017 in Tashkent, Uzbekistan.

Medal summary

Medal table

References
Results at AIBA

External links
Results

2017
Asian Boxing
International boxing competitions hosted by Uzbekistan